Isobel Moira Dunbar  (3 February 1918 – 22 November 1999) was a Scottish-Canadian glaciologist and Arctic sea-ice researcher.

Personal life
Moira Dunbar was born in 1918 in Edinburgh, Scotland. She grew up in Stornoway, Strathpeffer, and Kilmarnock, and attended Cranley School for Girls. Her father, William John Dunbar, was a popular sheriff and advocate of the Scottish Bar. Her brother Maxwell was a marine biologist who was also made FRSC OC. Moira also had a sister, Elizabeth Jenkins (née Dunbar).

While studying at the University of Oxford, Moira performed with the Oxford University Drama Society. After graduating with a BA (Hons) in Geography, Moira toured Great Britain with the English Theatre as a professional actor and stage manager. Outside of acting Moira had many creative pursuits - musically she was fond of the guitar and piano.

After emigrating to Canada and finding work with the federal government, Moira continued her language studies becoming certified as a linguist in the Russian language in 1958. She was also fluent in German and French. In 1964 she would travel to Russia to observe their icebreaking operations with a government team.

When Moria finally retired in 1978, she was the Director of the Division of Earth Sciences. Following retirement, Moria spent much of her time at her countryside home in Dunrobin, Ontario where she kept her animals. Moria was said to be an amusing and convivial friend, enjoying family time and traditional Scottish song-singing with her brother

Isobel Moira Dunbar passed away on 22 November 1999 in Nepean, Ontario, at the age of 81.

Education and life before career 
Moira Dunbar began her education at Cranley School for Girls in Edinburgh, Scotland, where she attended from grades 1 to 12. She later got accepted to study geography at St Anne’s College at the University of Oxford, where she completed her BA (Hons) in Geography by 1939. Dunbar then went on to complete a Masters in Geography in 1948. Dunbar grew up in a family of academics. Her brother’s career also followed a scientific path where he became a Fellow of the Royal Society of Canada. For Moira, however, her career didn’t begin with science research once she graduated from Oxford. Initially, Dunbar worked in the theatre industry, taking part in performances during the Second World War for the British Army, and touring around the United Kingdom with the English Theatre. She later stated that she was “hopeless as a young ingénue…” and that she was “known as a character juvenile,”.

Career
Dunbar travelled to Canada in 1947 on a visitor's visa and learned that the Canadian Government was in need of trained geographers. She joined the Joint Intelligence Bureau where her career began editing a book of Arctic terrain and sea-ice descriptions and photographs obtained by two Royal Canadian Air Force navigators, Keith Greenaway and Sidney E. Colthorpe. Dunbar's study of the 404,000 square miles of the Arctic mapped by the RCAF in 1947 along with the 911,000 square miles mapped the next year added some 5,000 square miles to Canadian lands, leaving only 15% of the Dominion north of 75° to be mapped from the air.

In 1952 she joined the Defence Research Board in the position of Scientific Staff Officer in the Arctic Research Section. She specialized in sea-ice and navigation through frozen Arctic waters. In 1954, she applied to join the crew of scientists on a Royal Canadian Navy icebreaker travelling to the Arctic, but her request was denied as women could not be allowed on Royal Naval vessels. In spite of Dunbar’s extensive qualifications, she experienced gender-based discrimination; initially being unable to take part in air and sea expeditions that were usually male only events. She continued her requests until being given permission to join an icebreaker with the Department of Transport in 1955. She served on numerous icebreakers and spent 560 hours on Royal Canadian Air Force aircraft, studying ice formations in the High Arctic. While upon the icebreakers, she utilized sideways-looking radar for airborne reconnaissance, figuring out how the ice moved through the process of photographing the ice at different times during the days and year. Her analysis of the ice conditions and measurement of the various pictures allowed her to determine the ice's position at different times of the year.

Dunbar went on many research excursions varying from flying with the RCAF to traveling on icebreakers. The combined knowledge and experience she gained enabled her to publish numerous papers on Arctic sea-ice, such as the 1956 paper she co-authored with RCAF navigator Keith Greenaway titled Arctic Canada from the Air. Dunbar and Greenway's book was the first civilian airborne geological survey of its kind and is considered essential material in the fields of Arctic and sea-ice science. In her other papers, Dunbar studied the use of radar remote-sensing in sea-ice research, promoted the standardization of sea-ice terminology, and wrote historical accounts of Arctic exploration. She investigated icebreaking methods in the Soviet Union and Finland in 1964, and was an adviser to the Canadian Defence Research Board's Arctic hovercraft trials in 1966–1969.

In 1976 while Dunbar was studying the use of radar remote sensing equipment to study the Arctic ice, she, in conjunction with the Royal Navy, used radar to map the Arctic ice surface and subsurface. While Dunbar flew overhead laser-profiling the topography of the Arctic ice surface, HMS Sovereign radar-mapped the underside of the same surface.

Isobel Moira Dunbar retired in 1978, running a hobby farm and volunteering as a local historian.

Achievements 
Moira Dunbar accomplished many “firsts” for women in science such as being among the first women to fly over the North Pole despite the initial discrimination she faced due to the fact she was a woman in a male dominated field.  During her time with the Royal Canadian Airforce, she contributed 600 hours of flight time and was described as “some sort of cross between delicate flower and a dangerous disease.” Moria was also the first woman to conduct scientific research from Canadian icebreakers. At first, the Royal Canadian Navy was against her joining for research because many members of the force claimed that they “expected [her] to go around seducing all the men or something.” Despite the assumptions made about her, Moira Dunbar worked to prove her worth through her studies and predictions of the movement of arctic ice. She was the first Canadian coordinator to successfully evaluate satellite photography for ice reconnaissance. Dunbar is considered an iconic woman to Canada because she has contributed many findings about arctic ice under the employment of the Canadian government. Moira recognized the immense contributions made by Russian scientists towards the study of sea-ice, and accordingly trained and certified as a Russian linguist in 1958. In 1969 Dunbar was present to observe the Arctic test of the largest icebreaker in history, the refitted tanker SS Manhattan, which would go on to become the first ship to cross the Northwest Passage.

Dunbar was one of the first Arctic scientists to observe and study polynyas, open areas of water or thin ice that develop in the winter when strong winds flow South from the Arctic Ocean combine with warm upwelling in the sea. Moira then went on to publish multiple papers involving ice conditions and polynyas

In 1971, Dunbar won the Meteorological Service of Canada's Centennial Award. In 1972 she was awarded the Royal Canadian Geographical Society's Massey Medal for "...her excellent work in Arctic geography and sea-ice"; she is the only woman to have won the medal. She was a Fellow of the Royal Society of Canada and was made an Officer of the Order of Canada in 1977. She also served as governor of the Arctic Institute of North America and director of the Royal Canadian Geographical Society.

After her passing, she chose to leave the seven acres of property she owned in Limavady, County Londonderry to the Queen’s Foundation, which to this day continues to honour her legacy as a woman in science.

Publications 

Academic papers and field work studies written by Moira Dunbar that display her understanding of Arctic geography as well as evidence.

 High Latitude Navigational Flights (Arctic Circular, 1951)
 Ice Islands: Evidence from North Greenland (Arctic, 1953)
 The Royal Arctic Theatre (Canadian Art, 1958)
 Thrust Structures in Young Sea Ice (Journal of Glaciology, 1960)

In 1956 Dunbar co-authored Arctic Canada from the Air with RCAF Wing Commander and navigator Keith Greenaway, the first ever comprehensive aerial examination of the Arctic geography by a civilian. She has also authored papers on radar remote sensing for sea-ice studies (1975), and as a proponent of winter navigation in the Gulf of St Lawrence, she and others worked to standardize sea-ice terminology (1965).

See also
 Timeline of women in science

References

1918 births
1999 deaths
Canadian glaciologists
20th-century Canadian women scientists
Scottish women scientists
20th-century geographers
Canadian geographers
Alumni of St Anne's College, Oxford
British emigrants to Canada
Fellows of the Royal Society of Canada
Officers of the Order of Canada
20th-century British women scientists
Massey Medal recipients
Scottish geographers
British glaciologists
Women glaciologists